(born January 24, 1951) is a Japanese vocalist, composer, lyricist, and keyboardist who made her debut in 1972.

Her first studio album entitled Shoujo was recorded in Los Angeles, produced by Grammy Award winner John Fischbach, with distinguished musicians such as David Campbell, Carole King and Charles Larkey who was King's husband at that time. Owing to her introspective compositions, Itsuwa was often nicknamed "Japanese Carole King", along with other Japanese singer-songwriters like Yumi Matsutoya (who had worked under her birth name "Yumi Arai" during the mid-1970s) and Minako Yoshida.

Itsuwa gained moderate success on the Japanese albums chart in her early career, and received massive popularity and acclaim through the single "Koibito yo" released in 1980. The song topped Japan's Oricon chart for three consecutive weeks, and won the 22nd Japan Record Award for "Gold Prize" in the same year. It was covered by the country's legendary singers including Hibari Misora and Noriko Awaya in later years, and became a signature song for Itsuwa. In 1981 her song "Revival" also became a very well recognized hit.

After "Koibito yo" became a hit, Itsuwa gained popularity also in non-Japanese Asian countries during the 1980s.

In Indonesia, "Kokoro No Tomo", "Amayadori" and "Rebaibaru" become the most popular songs ever released by her. In 2006, Mayumi Itsuwa and Delon Thamrin recorded an Indonesian and Japanese version of the song. This was later included on the 2006 compilation album "Duet Love Songs". Many of her songs would fall into the musical genre of torch songs because they often describe the lingering memory of past loves.

Discography

Albums

References 

1951 births
Living people
Japanese women singer-songwriters
Singers from Tokyo
20th-century Japanese women singers
20th-century Japanese singers
21st-century Japanese women singers
21st-century Japanese singers